Return to You is the second studio album by jazz singer Sara Gazarek. The album was released by Native Language Music on June 5, 2007. The album contains popular songs (Folk, Pop, Rock, Country), jazz tunes from 90's, and originals written by pianist Josh Nelson.

Track listing

Personnel
 Sara Gazarek - Vocal
 Josh Nelson - Piano, Hammond B-3, Glockenspiel
 Erik Kertes - Acoustic Bass, Guitar, Guitarlele
 Matt Slocum - Drums
 Seamus Blake - Tenor Saxophone, Guitar, Vocal (on track 2)
 Ambrose Akinmusire - Trumpet (on track 5)
 John Proulx - Vocal (on track 9)
 Supernova String Quintet - Strings (on tracks 4, 12, 13)
 Paul Cartwright - Violin
 Robert Anderson - Violin
 Miguel Atwood-Ferguson - Viola
 Jacob Szekely - Cello

Charts

References

External links
JazzTimes - Return to You Sara Gazarek — By Christopher Loudon
Music Review: Sara Gazarek - Return to You - Blogcritics Music

Sara Gazarek albums
2007 albums